In male human anatomy, the foreskin, also known as the prepuce, is the double-layered fold of skin, mucosal and muscular tissue at the distal end of the human penis that covers the glans and the urinary meatus. The foreskin is attached to the glans by an elastic band of tissue, known as the frenulum. The outer skin of the foreskin meets with the inner preputial mucosa at the area of the mucocutaneous junction. The foreskin is mobile, fairly stretchable and sustains the glans in a moist environment. Except for humans, a similar structure, known as penile sheath, appears in the male sexual organs of all primates and the vast majority of mammals.

In humans, foreskin length varies widely and coverage of the glans in a flaccid and erect state can also vary. The foreskin is fused to the glans at birth and is generally not retractable in infancy and early childhood. Inability to retract the foreskin in childhood should not be considered a problem unless there are other symptoms. Retraction of the foreskin is not recommended until it loosens from the glans before or during puberty. In adults, it is typically retractable over the glans, given normal development. The male prepuce is anatomically homologous to the clitoral hood in females. In some cases, the foreskin may become subject to a pathological condition.

Structure

External 
The outside of the foreskin is a continuation of the shaft skin of the penis and is covered by a keratinized stratified squamous epithelium. The inner foreskin is a continuation of the epithelium that covers the glans and is made up of glabrous squamous mucous membrane, like the inside of the eyelid or the mouth. The mucosal aspect of the prepuce has a great capacity for self-repair. The area of the outer foreskin measures 7–100 cm2, and the inner foreskin measures 18–68 cm.2 The mucocutaneous zone occurs where the outer and inner foreskin meet. The foreskin is free to move after it separates from the glans, which usually occurs before or during puberty. The inner foreskin is attached to the glans by the frenulum, a highly vascularized tissue of the penis. The World Health Organization states that "the frenulum forms the interface between the outer and inner foreskin layers, and when the penis is not erect, it tightens to narrow the foreskin opening.

Subcutaneous 
The human foreskin is a laminar structure made up of outer skin, mucosal epithelium, lamina propia, dartos fascia and dermis. The superficial dartos fascia, formerly called the peripenic muscle, is one of the two sheaths of smooth muscle tissue found below the penile skin, along with the underlying Buck's fascia or deep fascia of the penis. The dartos fascia extents within the skin of the prepuce and contains an abuncance of elastic fibers. These fibers form a whorl at the tip of the foreskin, known as the preputial orifice, which is narrow during infancy and childhood. The dartos fascia is sensitive to temperature and reacts to temperature changes by expanding and contracting. The fascia is only loosely connected with the underlying tissue, so that it provides the mobility and elasticity of the penile skin. Langerhans cells are immature dendritic cells that are found in all areas of the penile epithelium, but are most superficial in the inner surface of the foreskin.

As a continuation of the human shaft skin, the prepuce receives somatosensory innervation from the bilateral dorsal nerve of the penis and branches of the perineal nerve, and autonomic innervation from the pelvic plexus. The somatosensory receptors that are found in the prepuce are both nociceptors and mechanoreceptors, with a predominace of Meissner's corpuscles. Blood supply to the prepuce is provided by the preputial artery, a division of the axial and dorsal artery of the penis. The axial and dorsal arteries that run within the penile skin unite through perforating branches and give off the preputial arteries before they reach the corona of the glans. The preputial vein, an extension of the superficial dorsal vein, receives blood from the prepuce and connects to the larger dorsal veins of the penis that drain the rest of the penile shaft.

Development

Gestation
The penis develops from a primordial phallic structure that forms in the embryo during the early weeks of pregnancy, known as the genital tubercle. Initially undifferentiated, the tubercle develops into a penis depending on the exposure to male hormones secreted by the testes. The differentiation of the external sexual organs will be evident between twelve and sixteen weeks of gestation. Preputial development is initiated at around eleven weeks or earlier and continues up to eighteen weeks.

Historically, the theories regarding the stages of preputial development during gestation fall into two main ideas. The earliest report by Schweigger-Seidel (1866) and later Hunter (1935) suggested the formation of the prepuce out of dorsal skin and its progressive distal extension to completelly cover and eventually fuse with the epithelium of the glans. Glenister (1956) expanded the theory suggesting that the preputial fold results as an ingrowth of the cellular lamina, which rolls outwards over the glans, but with the resultant preputial lamina also expanding backwards to form an ingrowing fold at the coronal sulcus. The same idea was also described by Cold & Taylor (1999), Johnson (1920) and others.

By eleven and twelve weeks of gestation, the process of preputial formation is evident as a thickening of the epidermis that separates from the penis creating a raised fold, known as the preputial fold. On the underside of this structure forms the preputial lamina, which expands dorsolaterally over the base of the developing glans. At thirteen weeks, the prepuce has not yet extended to the distal tip of the glans covering only a part of its surface. By sixteen weeks, the bilateral preputial folds cover most of the glans and the ventral sides of the prepuce fuse in the midline. The penile raphe, the continuation of the perineal raphe in human males, occurs on the ventral side of the penis as a manifestation of the fusion of the urethral and preputial folds. The dorsal nerve of the penis, which is present as early as nine weeks of gestation, completely expands through branches to the distal end of the glans and prepuce by sixteen weeks. At nineteen weeks, foreskin development is complete. Towards the end of the second trimester, the glans and the prepuce have completely fused together by the preputial, sometimes referred to as balanopreputial lamina. At birth, this shared membrane is physiologically adherent to the glans preventing retraction in infancy and early childhood. The phenomenon of non-retractile foreskin in children naturally starts to resolve in varying ages; in childhood, preadolescence or puberty.

Retraction

During the first years of life, the inner foreskin is fused to the glans making them hard to manually separate. At that time, forced retraction can cause pain or microtearing and is thus not recommended. The two surfaces may begin to separate from early childhood, but complete separation and retraction is a process that normally occurs over time. The phenomenon of non retractile or tight foreskin in childhood, sometimes referred to as physiologic phimosis, may completely resolve before, during or even after puberty. When the foreskin starts to become retractile, a pediatrician can recommend careful retraction at home and rinsing with water during bath. Mild soap may be used, but can be avoided, if it causes irritation. If full retraction is hard to achieve, the child may only wash the exposed area of the glans. Since there is no specific age when non-retractile foreskin begins to resolve, the time of foreskin retraction can vary considerably among children. 

During puberty, as the male begins to sexually mature, foreskin retractability gradually increases allowing more comfortable exposure of the glans when needed. Gentle washing under the foreskin during shower and maintaining good genital hygiene is sufficient to prevent smegma buildup. Smegma is an oily secretion in the genitals of both sexes that maintains the moist texture of the mucosal surfaces and prevents friction. In boys, it helps resolve the natural adhension of the glans and inner prepuce. By the end of puberty, most boys have a fully retractable foreskin.

Variability 
In children, the foreskin usually covers the glans completely but in adults it may not. During erection, the degree of automatic foreskin retraction varies considerably; in some adults, when the foreskin is longer than the erect penis, it will not spontaneously retract upon erection. In this case, the foreskin remains covering all or some of the glans until retracted manually or by sexual activity. The foreskin can be classified as long, when the preputial orifice extents beyond the glans, medium, when the preputial orifice is located around the meatus, and short, when most of the glans is exposed. The variation of long foreskin was regarded by Chengzu (2011) as 'prepuce redundant'. Frequent retraction and washing under the foreskin is suggested for all adults, particularly for those with a long or 'redundant' foreskin. Some males, according to Xianze (2012), may be reluctant for their glans to be exposed because of discomfort when it chafes against clothing, although the discomfort on the glans was reported to diminish within one week of continuous exposure. Guochang (2010) states that for those whose foreskins are too tight to retract or have some adhesions, forcible retraction should be avoided since it may cause injury.

Function 

The World Health Organization (WHO) stated in 2007 that there was "debate about the role of the foreskin, with possible functions including keeping the glans moist, protecting the developing penis in utero, or enhancing sexual pleasure due to the presence of nerve receptors". The foreskin helps to provide sufficient skin during an erection. The foreskin protects the glans. In infants, it protects the glans from ammonia and feces in diapers, which reduces the incidence of meatal stenosis. And the foreskin helps prevent the glans from getting abrasions and trauma throughout life. The fold of the prepuce produces sub-preputial wetness, helping to maintain the naturally moisturized state of the glans penis. The foreskin contains Meissner's corpuscles, which are nerve endings involved in fine-touch sensitivity. A study of skin samples found that, compared to other hairless skin areas on the body, the Meissner's index was highest in the finger tip (0.96) and lowest in the foreskin (0.28) suggested that the foreskin has the least sensitive hairless tissue of the body.

Evolution
The foreskin is present in the vast majority of mammals, including non-human primates, such as the chimpanzee. In primates, the foreskin is present in the genitalia of both sexes and likely has been present for millions of years of evolution. The evolution of complex penile morphologies like the foreskin may have been influenced by females.

In modern times, there is controversy regarding whether the foreskin is a vital or vestigial structure. In 1949, British physician Douglas Gairdner noted that the foreskin plays an important protective role in newborns. He wrote, "It is often stated that the prepuce is a vestigial structure devoid of function... However, it seems to be no accident that during the years when the child is incontinent the glans is completely clothed by the prepuce, for, deprived of this protection, the glans becomes susceptible to injury from contact with sodden clothes or napkin." During the physical act of sex, the foreskin reduces friction, which can reduce the need for additional sources of lubrication. The College of Physicians and Surgeons of British Columbia has written that the foreskin is "composed of an outer skin and an inner mucosa that is rich in specialized sensory nerve endings and erogenous tissue." "Some medical researchers... claim circumcised men enjoy sex just fine and that, in view of recent research on HIV transmission, the foreskin causes more trouble than it's worth." In the March 2017 publication of the Global Health Journal: Science and Practice, Morris and Krieger wrote, "The variability in foreskin size is consistent with the foreskin being a vestigial structure."

Clinical significance 
The foreskin can be involved in balanitis, phimosis, sexually transmitted infection and penile cancer. The American Academy of Pediatricians' now expired 2012 technical report on circumcision found that the foreskin tends to harbor micro-organisms that can lead to urinary tract infections in infants and tend to contribute to the transmission of sexually transmitted infections in adults. In some cases of recurrent pathologies, excessive soap washing may irritate the mucosa, therefore washing of the area should be done gently.

Frenulum breve is a frenulum that is insufficiently long to allow the foreskin to fully retract, which may lead to discomfort during intercourse.

Phimosis is a condition where the foreskin of an adult cannot be retracted properly. Phimosis can be treated by using topical steroid ointments and using lubricants during sex; for severe cases circumcision may be necessary. Posthitis is an inflammation of the foreskin.

A condition called paraphimosis may occur if a tight foreskin becomes trapped behind the glans and swells as a restrictive ring. This can cut off the blood supply, resulting in ischemia of the glans penis.

Lichen sclerosus is a chronic, inflammatory skin condition that most commonly occurs in adult women, although it may also be seen in men and children. Topical clobetasol propionate and mometasone furoate were proven effective in treating genital lichen sclerosus.

Some birth defects of the foreskin can occur; all of them are rare. In aposthia there is no foreskin at birth, in micropathia the foreskin does not cover the glans, and in macroposthia, also called and congenital megaprepuce, the foreskin extends well past the end of the glans.

It has been found that larger foreskins place men who are not circumcised at an increased risk of HIV infection most likely due to the larger surface area of inner foreskin and the high concentration of Langerhans cells.

Society and culture

Modifications

Circumcision is the removal of the foreskin, either partially or completely.  It is most commonly performed as an elective procedure for prophylactic, cultural, or religious reasons. Circumcision may also be performed on children or adults to treat phimosis, balanitis, and other pathologies.  The ethics of circumcision in children is a source of controversy.

As of 2012, no successful technique to reconstruct a circumcised foreskin had been published. Some men have used weights to stretch the skin of the penis to regrow a foreskin; the resulting tissue does cover the glans but does not replicate the features of a foreskin.

Other cultural or aesethetic practices include genital piercings involving the foreskin and slitting the foreskin.

Preputioplasty is the most common foreskin reconstruction technique, most often done when a boy is born with a foreskin that is too small; a similar procedure is performed to relieve a tight foreskin without resorting to circumcision.

Foreskin restoration and regeneration 

Foreskin restoration is the process of expanding the skin on the penis to reconstruct an organ similar to the foreskin, which has been removed by circumcision or injury. Foreskin restoration is of ancient origin, when surgical means were taken to lengthen the foreskin of individuals born with either a short foreskin that did not cover the glans completely or a completely exposed glans as a result of circumcision. Foreskin restoration is primarily accomplished by stretching the residual skin of the penis, but surgical methods also exist. Some forms of restoration involve only partial regeneration in instances of a high-cut wherein the circumcisee feels that the circumciser removed too much skin and that there is not enough skin for erections to be comfortable.

Foreskin-based products

Foreskins obtained from circumcision procedures are frequently used by biochemical and micro-anatomical researchers to study the structure and proteins of human skin. In particular, foreskins obtained from newborns have been found to be useful in the manufacturing of more human skin.

Foreskins of babies are also used for skin graft tissue, and for β-interferon-based drugs.

Foreskin-derived fibroblasts have been used in biomedical research, and cosmetic applications.

History
The foreskin was considered a sign of beauty, civility, and masculinity throughout the Greco-Roman world. In ancient Greece, foreskins were valued, especially those that were longer. The earliest known illustrative depiction of the foreskin dates back to Egyptian kingdoms.

The foreskin has also been depicted in art from different historical ages:

Notes

References

External links 

Infant foreskin care at Kidshealth.org.nz
 
Management of foreskin conditions  – Statement from the British Association of Paediatric Urologists on behalf of the British Association of Paediatric Surgeons and The Association of Paediatric Anaesthetists (2007).

Sexual arousal
Pelvis
Penis
Human penis anatomy
Human male reproductive system
Mammal penis
Urinary system
Human anatomy